The Red Party is a political party in Norway. It was founded in March 2007 by a merger of the Red Electoral Alliance and the Workers' Communist Party. A Marxist party, it has been described as left-wing and far-left on the political spectrum. In its political programme, the Red Party sets the creation of a classless society to be its ultimate goal, which the party says is "what Karl Marx called communism". The party's other goals are replacing capitalism with socialism, an expansive public sector and nationalisation of large enterprises. It has a revolutionary socialist ideology, which aims towards new legislatures taking power on behalf of the workers, though the party does not support violent armed revolution as espoused by its predecessors in the 1970s and 1980s. It strongly opposes Norway becoming a member of the European Union.

The Red Party has 20 county council representatives nationwide and 193 municipal representatives. In the 2013 parliamentary election, it was the largest party that failed to win a seat. The party entered Parliament in the 2017 election, winning 2.4% of the vote and its first seat ever in the Storting. The last time a far-left party had representation in the Storting was when its predecessor party, the Red Electoral Alliance, won a seat in 1993. In the 2021 parliamentary election, the party achieved its best result ever, with 4.6% of the vote, securing eight seats in Parliament.

Ideology and positions 
The party supports the existing welfare state in Norway and high taxation upon the wealthy as a means of tackling continuing inequality in Norway. Since its formation, notable groups have merged with the party, the most notable example of this being the Trotskyist International Socialists. The party consists of various internal factions, including Trotskyists, Marxist–Leninists, and democratic socialists. One of the Red Party's primary objectives is to protect the Norwegian welfare state, calling for the government to spend 30 to 40 billion Norwegian krones on the public sector to counter the financial crisis of 2007–2008. Red politician Mimir Kristjansson said that the "right-wing parties have proved their willingness to dismantle the very foundation of our welfare state." According Kristjansson, the socialist parties, along with the Labour Party, need to be forced into a policy which strongly protects the welfare model for the poor. In the aftermath of the 2021 Norwegian parliamentary election, Kristjansson said that the political right promoted, funded by the right-wing fundraiser billionaire Stein Erik Hagen, and engaged in a Red Scare campaign "to brand the Red Party as supporters of Stalinist genocide and Communist dictatorship" in which the party is seen as "just as bad as Nazism", even though "it has fought long and hard to convince voters of their commitment to a democratic form of Marxist socialism built on the proud Norwegian labor movement's most radical traditions."

The results of the 2009 Norwegian parliamentary election, which were regarded as disappointing for the Red Party, led to some internal turmoil, with some members wanting the party to move ideologically closer to the Socialist Left Party. After being challenged on the party's position on liberal democracy in 2012, party leader Moxnes wrote in Aftenposten that "free speech, freedom of association, free elections, free media, and independent courts that guarantee rule of law for individuals are fundamental for a socialist society". The continued mention of communism in the party program has been a hotly debated topic in the party, with much of the leadership, including Moxnes, wanting to abandon mention of the ideology in favour of a purely democratic socialist line. The party voted to remain ideologically committed to communism in 2014, and, again, in 2019, by a majority in the national conference. The Red Party has been described as Marxist in the 2017 and 2021 parliamentary elections.

History

Formation (2007) 
The Red Party was founded on 7 March 2007 as a merger between the Red Electoral Alliance and the Workers' Communist Party. The two parties had shared the same history for decades, because the Workers' Communist Party founded the Red Electoral Alliance as an electoral party that would promote communist and socialist values. During the national convention held by the Red Electoral Alliance in February 2007, a faction within the party stated it would support the merger of the two parties if any references to communism in the new party program would be removed.
 
During a secret meeting between the leading staff of both parties on 5 March, a vote was held, with most members supporting the merger. The Workers' Communist Party was official dissolved in April 2007. During the party's first national convention, three names were considered: Red Choice, Solidarity, and Red Cloth. When founded, the party saw it as its main mission to fill "the void" between it and the Red-Green Coalition. When talking about the party program, Torstein Dahle said: "We will bring up issues which have broad agreement among the people of Norway, but are unfortunately not reflected in the other parties' policies."

Dahle (2007–2010) 

Torstein Dahle was unanimously elected party leader by members of the Workers' Communist Party and the Red Electoral Alliance in February 2007. This was met with criticism by outsiders, who claimed that Dahle would not be able to lead the party in a "new direction". The then leader of the Workers' Communist Party, Ingrid Baltzersen, was elected the party's deputy leader.

On 23 July 2007, Dahle became subject to media attention when he said that the Taliban and other Afghan rebels had the full right to fight Norwegian soldiers stationed in Afghanistan. The attention occurred only days later with the death of a Norwegian army officer in the Logar Province as a Norwegian military unit came under hostile fire. Dahle later replied to the criticism, saying that he did not support the death of Norwegian military personnel.

When planning for the 2007 Norwegian local elections, the party thought it had a realistic chance of gaining the mayorship in three municipalities. During the local elections, the party was forced to campaign under the banner of the Red Electoral Alliance, as the Election Committee had not approved its new name.

Election researcher Bernt Aardal believed that Red would be able win votes from voters who usually voted for the Socialist Left Party. The reasoning behind this was that the Socialist Left became part of the ruling red–green coalition, and would constantly need to make compromises with the two other parties in the coalition. When confronted with his research, he replied: "This is not a large voter group. We've looked at some polls in the past that RV would give the party one or two seats in Parliament. It is difficult to say whether the new party will make a difference."

After experiencing what many described as a bad election, Trond Andresen, a leading political figure within the party, resigned. He said the party was going in a downward spiral and would meet the same fate as the Communist Party of Norway if it did not renew its image. Among several known candidates that were officially announced or rumoured to be running for party leader were Bjørnar Moxnes, Mona Bjørn, Asgeir Drugli, Mimir Kristjansson, and Ingeborg Steinholt.

Thomassen (2010–2012) 

Turid Thomassen was voted in as party leader of Red in May 2010. Thomassen has long experience from both the Workers' Communist Party and the Red Electoral Alliance. The former leader of Red Youth (2004–2006), Bjørnar Moxnes, became deputy leader.

Moxnes (2012–present) 

Bjørnar Moxnes was elected party leader in May 2012. During Moxnes' leadership, the party has increased its vote share severalfold. The party first broke Norway's 4% election threshold in the 2021 parliamentary elections, and entered the Storting with 4,7% and 8 deputies. The party subsequently grew in polls, reaching 10,3% and placing third in a nationwide poll conducted in February 2022 in its highest poll result to date.

Youth programs 

The party's youth wing is Red Youth, which was founded in 1963, preceding the foundations of the Red Electoral Alliance and the Workers' Communist Party. The current leader of the youth wing is Alberte Bekkhus. Red Youth was highly supportive of the merging of the Red Electoral Alliance and the Communist Party, with Sandra Johansen, leader of Red Youth in Brønnøysund, claiming "it to have been difficult to be a youth party under two different parent parties".

Former Deputy Leader of the Red Electoral Alliance Marte Mjøs Persen left the party, believing there was a big generational gap between the older and younger members of Red. She further claimed that only the older members, who have their origins from the foundation of the Red Electoral Alliance and the Workers' Communist Party, controlled the party. Persen's statements were met with a positive response by fellow party members and outsiders. Mathias Furevik, who had served as Dahle's campaign manager, agreed with her accusations. Bergen City Council representative, Stine Akre, reluctantly agreed with Persen's accusations and said: "Red is now a party for middle-aged men, and has not been able to get rid of the generation gap. It also means that many younger people will get burned out before they move the party's direction." Persen shortly after joined the Labour Party.

Electoral results 
In the 2007 Norwegian local elections, the Red Party won 2.1% of the votes. After the 2007 county elections, Knut Henning Thygesen became the party's first and only mayor elected through a direct mayor election in the municipality of Risør. 

In the 2009 Norwegian parliamentary election, the result was 1.3% of votes, giving the party no seats in the parliament. The party came closest to winning a seat in Oslo, where it took nearly 4% of the vote. In 2009, electoral researcher Bernt Aardal commented that the Red Party would have won a single seat in Oslo during the 2009 elections had it not been for the fact that the voting system is designed to ensure that more MPs come from rural areas. 

In the 2011 Norwegian local elections, the party won 1.7% of the votes. The Oslo constituency was considered to be where the party had its best chance of gaining a seat in the 2013 Norwegian parliamentary election but failed to win any seats. In the 2017 Norwegian parliamentary election, the party broke through in Oslo, with party leader Moxnes being elected for the first time.

In the 2021 Norwegian parliamentary election, the Red Party achieved 4.6% of votes and secured eight (8) seats in parliament, its largest share of the vote—and its largest parliamentary representation—to date.

Parliamentary elections

Local elections

Party leaders

References

External links 
 Red Party official website (in Norwegian)
 Red Youth official website (in Norwegian)

 
Communist parties in Norway
Democratic socialist parties in Europe
Republicanism in Norway